Acropora polystoma is a species of acroporid coral that was first described by G. Brook in 1891. It is classed as a vulnerable species on the IUCN Red List, and it has a decreasing population. It is not common and found over a large area and is classified under CITES Appendix II.

Description
Acropora polystoma is found in colonies of clumps or of corymbose plates with diameters not exceeding . It is blue, cream, yellow, lavender, or brown in colour, and the branches are similar in size and become thinner towards the ends. The branches contain axial and radial corallites. Radial corallites are regularly arranged and found in rows, and are tube-shaped. It contains a small number of randomly positioned spinules. It is similar to Acropora massawensis and other species of the robusta group. It occurs on slopes of reefs damaged by strong waves, and reef edges. It is composed of aragonite (calcium carbonate).

Distribution
Acropora polystoma is uncommon and found over a large area; the Gulf of Aden, the Indian Ocean, the Indo-Pacific, Southeast Asia, Australia, and the western Pacific. The species also occurs in Japan, American Samoa, the Cook Islands, and five regions of Indonesia. It spawns in October in the French Polynesia. It is threatened by reef destruction, climate change, rising sea temperatures leading to bleaching, coral disease, being prey to starfish Acanthaster planci, and human activity and infrastructure. It is listed as a vulnerable species on the IUCN Red List, is under CITES Appendix II, and might be found in Marine Protected Areas.

Taxonomy
It was first described by G. Brook in 1891 as Madrepora polystoma.

References

Acropora
Corals described in 1891
Vulnerable animals